re:publica is a conference in Europe that deals with the Web 2.0, especially blogs, social media and information society. It annually takes place in May in Berlin. During three days talks and workshops about various topics are held, ranging from media and culture over politics and technology to entertainment. All talks and discussions are streamed directly to the internet.

The conference is organized by the operators of the German blogs Spreeblick and netzpolitik.org and is funded by Medienboard Berlin-Brandenburg and Bundeszentrale für politische Bildung. Re:publica originates from res publica, Latin for 'public matter'.

History
The first re:publica, with the slogan "Leben im Netz" (Life in the internet), took place from 11 to 13 April 2007 and attracted about 700 visitors. Over the years the event grew continually, with  international visitors and about 350 speakers in 2013. Each year, different main focusses were set, for example data protection in 2008 and intellectual property rights and political aspects of internet usage in 2009.

In 2011, Daniel Domscheit-Berg introduced the  project OpenLeaks as a planned politically neutral alternative to WikiLeaks during the conference.

A highlight in 2012 was a talk with the European Commissioner for Digital Agenda Neelie Kroes who demanded to stop ACTA and SOPA.

The eighth re:publica, titled "Into the Wild", took place in May 2014. The conference had 350 sessions on 18 stages, 500 volunteers and  people overall, breaking its attendance record.

The ninth re:publica took place from 5 May 2015 to 7 May 2015 with over  people attending and 450 speakers, was the biggest re:publica ever.

Events 
 re:publica'07 – Leben im Netz
 re:publica'08 – Die kritische Masse
 re:publica'09 – Shift happens
 re:publica'10 – now here
 re:publica'11
 re:publica'12 – Act!on
 re:publica'13 – IN/SIDE/OUT
 re:publica'14 – INTO THE WILD
 re:publica'15 – Finding Europe
 re:publica'16 – TƎИ
 re:publica'17 – Love out Loud!
 re:publica'18 – POP
 re:publica'19 – tl;dr
 re:publica'20 – ASAP
 re:publica'21 – In the Mean Time
 re:publica'22 – Any Way the Wind Blows
 re:publica'23 – CASH

See also 
 ConventionCamp
 TED (conference)

References

External links 

 
 Fotostream of re:publica at Flickr
 Event Calendar of re:publica

Recurring events established in 2007
Web-related conferences
2007 establishments in Germany
May events
Annual events in Berlin